Movimiento de Arte y Cultura Latino Americana (MACLA) is a contemporary arts space focused on the Chicano and Latino experience and history, located in the SoFA district at 510 South First Street in San Jose, California. The museum was founded in 1989, in order to encourage civic dialog and social equity. The current programming includes visual art, performing and literary arts, youth arts education, and a community art program. The space has two performing arts spaces, a gallery and the MACLA Castellano Playhouse and they frequently host poetry readings and film screenings.

History 

The Movimiento de Arte y Cultura Latino Americana was founded in 1989 by Maribel Alvarez, Mary Jane Solis, Rick Sajor and Eva Terrazas. They envisioned arts programming as a vehicle for civic dialogue and social equity as San José’s urban core underwent redevelopment. Alvarez, former executive director for MACLA (1996–2003), begins her historic essay of early MACLA in terms of revival of a Latino cultural center plus public debates about the identity and future of San José and Latino arts advocacy in the 1980s. For decades there was a disagreement with MACLA and the city of San Jose, the city wanted the museum to be based in the Mexican Heritage Plaza but MACLA wanted to be part of the contemporary art dialog happening in the city in the downtown area. 

Between 2009 until 2013, MACLA started the process of securing grants and funds to buy their building. The building closed escrow in May 2013, which secured a future of Latinx engagement and physical space in the downtown San Jose community during gentrification. Anjee Helstrup-Alvarez has served as the executive director of MACLA since 2011 until present. A 2016 mural by artist Aaron De La Cruz is on the outside of the museum building

Exhibitions 
This is a list of select visual art exhibitions at MACLA, to give example of programming.

See also 
 The Tech Museum of Innovation
 Children's Discovery Museum of San Jose
 San Jose Museum of Art

References

External links 

 

Contemporary art galleries in the United States
Art museums established in 1989
Museums in San Jose, California
Tourist attractions in Silicon Valley
Art museums and galleries in California
Art in the San Francisco Bay Area
Latino museums in the United States